Events from the year 1663 in Ireland.

Incumbent
Monarch: Charles II

Events
January 1 – the Franciscan chapel in Cook Street, Dublin, is raided by the military.
May 21 – Colonel Thomas Blood fails in an attempt to seize Dublin Castle in support of the claims of Cromwellian soldiers.
July 27 – the Parliament of England passes the second Navigation Act, restricting Irish trade with colonies and the cattle trade with England.
August 20 – James Margetson is translated from Archbishop of Dublin to Archbishop of Armagh (Church of Ireland) and Primate of All Ireland.
The Cooper family are granted Markree Castle.

Arts and literature
Katherine Philips' translation of Pierre Corneille's Pompée is successfully produced at the Theatre Royal, Dublin (Smock Alley Theatre), the first English language play written by a woman to be performed on the professional stage. It is published in Dublin and London later in the year.

Births
Francis Bernard, lawyer and politician (d. 1731)
approximate date – Frederick Hamilton, politician (d. 1715)

Deaths
August 20 – Nicholas Barnewall, 1st Viscount Barnewall, politician (b. 1592)
September 15 – Hugh Montgomery, 1st Earl of Mount Alexander, soldier (b. c.1623)

References

 
1660s in Ireland
Ireland
Years of the 17th century in Ireland